Peter Apo is a Trustee of the Office of Hawaiian Affairs and President of The Peter Apo Company, LLC, a cultural tourism consulting firm. He is also an accomplished musician in the folk and Hawaiian music genres, with a career stretching back to the early 1960's.

Public Service Career

Peter has had a distinguished career in public service. In 1980, he was elected to the first Board of Trustees of OHA. In 1982 he won election to the Hawaii State House of Representatives where he served for 14 years.  In 1994 Honolulu Mayor Jeremy Harris appointed him to become the City’s Director of Culture and Arts.  In 1996 he assumed the position of Special Assistant on Hawaiian Affairs to Governor Ben Cayetano.  He subsequently returned to the City & County of Honolulu as Director of Waikiki Development. He was re-elected as a Trustee of the Office of Hawaiian Affairs in 2010.

He is a founding member of the Native Hawaiian Hospitality Association, served as its past chairman, and was its Director of Culture & Education.  He has chaired the Pacific Islanders in Communications, and is a past chair of the Historic Hawaii Foundation and the Friends of the Natatorium. He has also served on the Chaminade University Board of Regents and the board of directors for the Hawaii Visitors and Convention Bureau.  He also had the honor of serving as Civilian Aide to the U.S. Secretary of the Army for West Oahu and Kauai. He continues serving the community on numerous boards and commissions.

Musical career

Peter Apo is also an accomplished singer & songwriter. He is one of three founding members of the 60's folk band The Travelers 3. He has since performed as a soloist, as well as in several other bands.

References
 

Living people
Members of the Hawaii House of Representatives
Musicians from Honolulu
Year of birth missing (living people)